The Yale Observatory Zone Catalog a series of star catalogs published by the Yale University Observatory for 1939 to 1983, containing around 400,000 records.

A total of 25 catalogs were published, so all references to stars include both the catalog number and the star number.

See also
Bright Star Catalogue
Ida Barney
Ellen Dorrit Hoffleit
Frank Schlesinger

External links 
Integrated Yale Observatory Zone Catalogs

Astronomical catalogues
Astronomical catalogues of stars